The Boura Mountains are a mountain range in Djibouti. The altitude and size of the range affects its weather, with precipitation levels varying greatly and climatic conditions consisting of distinct zones. Issa Somali have a long history in the Boura Mountains.

History
Issa Somali have inhabited the area for at least 2,000 years. The French probably travelled around the Boura Mountains in 1899. The most famous town in the area is the town of Ali Adde located 2 km north. The principal languages spoken in the area are Somali

Geography
Boura Mountains is actually a cluster of mountains with two distinct summits, each about the same height. The mountain forms one of the geographic resources of the area.

Ecology
The geology of the Boura Mountains is complex. The dense mountain forest sits at an altitude of between 550–900 m above sea level, and has a mean annual rainfall of 200–280 mm. The highlands experience, as most tropical regions, two seasons; the rainy season is from mid-June to mid-September and the dry season from October to June. In addition to rainfall, the Boura Mountains receive additional precipitation in the form of fog and winter rains which sustain isolated forests of Juniperus, Buxus, Acacia, Acacia tortilis, Juniperus procera, etc. The Boura Mountains have attracted many animals, such as gazelles, birds, hamadryas baboon and black-backed jackal. Rainfall is limited, with variations based on elevation.

Fauna and flora
A number of birds are found in the mountains including Egyptian vultures. Mammals include the Dorcas gazelle which is found in the Boura Mountains. The mountains are rich in plant life, including a number of different species. The vegetation changes with altitude, the mountains are covered with desert scrublands at lower elevations, growing richer and then becoming scrubland.

Climate
The Boura Mountains features a somewhat rare version of a steppe climate, located close to the equator. The mountains catch the precipitation of the monsoon winds of the Gulf of Aden, resulting in a rainy season that lasts from July until mid-September. Due to its altitude of the high ranges of mountains which embrace it provide a pleasant climate, with refreshing cool summer nights and excellent spring, while winter days are pretty cold and the nights could reach . It is common for afternoon temperatures to be over  yet mornings can be extremely cooler. As a result, there is much more natural vegetation. Other issues Boura Mountains faces are soil erosion and overgrazing. All of these environmental issues produce soil degradation.

Hiking paths
The mountain has a strong undergrowth and it cannot be walked up from every direction. The main path starts on the eastern side.

References
Boura Mountains, Ali Sabieh, Djibouti

Mountains of Djibouti